Gearin is a surname.

People with the name Gearin include:

 Dinty Gearin, American baseball player
 John M. Gearin, American politician
 Lawrence Gearin, Newfoundland politician
 Sally Gearin, Australian lawyer
 Steve Gearin, Australian footballer

See also
Cory Gearrin, American baseball player